Blanche Muriel Bristol (21 April 1888 – 15 March 1950) was a British phycologist who worked at Rothamsted Research (then Rothamsted Experimental Station) in 1919. Her research focused on the mechanisms by which algae acquire nutrients.

Statistics and tea

One day at Rothamsted, Ronald Fisher offered Bristol a cup of hot tea that he had just drawn from an urn. Bristol declined it, saying that she preferred the flavour when the milk was poured into the cup before the tea. Fisher scoffed that the order of pouring could not affect the flavour. Bristol insisted that it did and that she could tell the difference. Overhearing this debate, William Roach said, "Let's test her."

Fisher and Roach hastily put together an experiment to test Bristol's ability to identify the order in which the two liquids were poured into several cups. At the conclusion of this experiment in which she correctly identified all eight, Roach proclaimed that "Bristol divined correctly more than enough of those cups into which tea had been poured first to prove her case".

This incident led Fisher to do important work in the design of statistically valid experiments based on the statistical significance of experimental results. He developed Fisher's exact test to assess the probabilities and statistical significance of experiments.

Family life
Bristol was born on 21 April 1888, the daughter of Alfred Bristol, a commercial traveller, and Annie Eliza, née Davies. She studied botany and completed a PhD on algae at Birmingham, under the tutelage of George Stephen West. Bristol married William Roach in 1923. She died in Bristol on 15 March 1950 of ovarian cancer.

Algae
The green algae species Chlamydomonas muriella is named after her and possibly the genus Muriella.

References

1888 births
1950 deaths
British phycologists
Women phycologists
20th-century British women scientists
Deaths from ovarian cancer
Deaths from cancer in England
20th-century English scientists
20th-century British botanists
British women botanists
English botanists